The Uraga class was a series of 2 mine countermeasure vessels for the Japan Maritime Self-Defense Force. They were both built and commissioned in the 1990s.

Development 
It was built as an alternative to JDS Hayase and JDS Sōya, as the class of ships combined the functions of both. Reflecting the experience of Hayase dispatched to the Persian Gulf, the function of the ship was improved, and the newly introduced air minesweeper (Mk.105) was introduced and acquired from the dock. A helicopter support function for performing air minesweeping was also required. As a result, they became considerably larger, and although they were finally made slightly smaller than originally planned to be 5,600 tons, the amount of wastewater is still doubled compared to 44MST.

The construction of the name ship was approved for 29.7 billion yen in the 1994 plan, which is the latter half of the 2003 medium-term defense. The construction of the second ship was also approved in the next year's plan.

Design 
In terms of design, there are many elements in common with the 8,900-ton transport ship (05LST) planned in parallel, such as the bulbous bow and the stealth tower mast. A flat deck ship type is adopted, and in the main hull from the center of the hull to the stern, there are well decks in the center and mine storages on both sides, which are equivalent to two layers of the second and third decks, respectively. It is installed at a height and has a gate that opens and closes hydraulically at the stern. Of the gates, the large one in the center is for aviation minesweepers and is said to be a lower hinge type. On the other hand, the small ones on both sides are connected to the mine storage and are of the upper hinge type.

The flight deck has a fairly large area to support the MH-53E helicopter. The rear part of the superstructure located in front of it is used as a maintenance hangar for air minesweepers. The helicopter deck and the well deck are connected by an elevator, and normally, the aviation sweeping equipment maintained in the maintenance hangar on the first deck is returned to the hangar by the elevator and dropped and collected from here, but the first The rear port crane force is said to be 8 tons so that it can be dropped and picked up from the deck.

Although the stealth ship was designed with consideration for stealth, the main hull was not intentionally tilted in consideration of the case where the minesweeper was replenished sideways. In addition, for horizontal replenishment, a recess is attached to the second deck level, and equipment such as a gate is provided.

Like the 05LST, the main engine was also equipped with the 12V42M-A (9,900bhp / 600rpm), a 4-cycle V-type 12-cylinder medium-speed diesel engine manufactured by Mitsui Engineering & Shipbuilding.

Ships in class

References 

Mine warfare vessels of the Japan Maritime Self-Defense Force
Mine warfare vessel classes